The women's 200 metres individual medley event at the 2002 Commonwealth Games took place 30 July. The heats and the final were held on 30 July.

Results

Final

Key: WR = World record

Preliminaries

References
Heats Results

Swimming at the 2002 Commonwealth Games
2002 in women's swimming